The Cultus River is a stream in the U.S. state of Oregon, located in Deschutes County. originating at Cultus lake Oregon and flowing three miles through deschutes national forest into crane prairie reservoir.

See also
 List of rivers of Oregon

References

Rivers of Deschutes County, Oregon
Rivers of Oregon